The Beacon-class gunvessels were a class of composite gunboats built for the Royal Navy in the late 1860s. They were the first warships of the Royal Navy expressly designed to use the engines of an older class of ships with a different hull shape. They were generally deployed overseas to the China, East Indies, West Africa, Pacific, North America and West Indies Stations. In addition to showing the flag, the ships fought pirates and suppressed the slave trade in East and West Africa. As their engines wore out in the mid-1880s, they were mostly retired and scrapped by the end of the decade. A few survived into the early 1900s as they were modified for harbour service before being sold or scrapped.

Design and description
These ships were designed by Sir Edward Reed, the Director of Naval Construction, as replacements for the various gunvessels built for the Crimean War. Being built of green timber, their hulls were starting to rot after a decade or more in service, but their engines were still generally sound. As the older ships were broken up their engines were salvaged and transferred to Beacon-class ships under construction. Combat experience against Chinese fortifications had shown that the single 32-pounder smoothbore armament of the earlier ships was not powerful enough so Reed was directed to prepare a twin-screw, shallow draft design suitable for riverine operations that incorporated a pair of steam engines from the older gunboats, a heavy armament, and enough freeboard to allow for service at sea. These rather contradictory requirements forced Reed to discard traditional wooden framing for these ships and the Beacon class became the first ships of the Royal Navy to be framed in iron with wooden planking.

They displaced  as built and had a burthen of 464 tons. Their crew consisted of 80 officers and enlisted men.

Two different types of engines were used with this class. Twelve ships received two-cylinder horizontal return connecting rod engines built by Maudslay, Sons and Field while the remaining six got two-cylinder horizontal trunk engines from John Penn and Sons. Each engine powered a single  propeller. Three cylindrical boilers provided steam to the engines, although the working pressure varied; the ships with trunk engines used  while the other engines used . The ships carried  of coal although no range figures are available.

To minimise their draught the Beacons were given a very full hull shape with squared-off bilges and a flat bottom. Admiral G. A. Ballard commented that they were built "along the lines of an extremely elongated packing crate." This made them steady gun platforms and gave them quite a bit of buoyancy. If they ran aground, this shape allowed them to be pulled off easily and they remained upright if stranded by a receding tide. However, this hull shape made their steering erratic at low speeds or in a following sea and they made a large amount of leeway in a strong side breeze.

The class was barque rigged and their best speed under sail alone was over  if running before the wind, despite the drag of the propellers, which could neither be hoisted out of the water, nor feathered. In a headwind, Ballard described them as "quite unmanageable under sail alone", while Preston claims they "sailed like tea trays". Their funnels were hinged to lower horizontally to reduce wind resistance while under sail. Avon, Dwarf and Elk were re-rigged as barquentines after 1880. A poop deck was added in between commissions to some of the ships, but this was the only major structural change made during their careers.

The ships were initially armed with a mix of 7-inch and 64-pounder 56 cwt rifled muzzle-loading guns and a pair of 20-pounder rifled breechloading guns. The  and 64-pounder guns were mounted on the centreline as pivot guns while the two 20-pounder guns were mounted at the bow and stern as chase guns. It was credited with the nominal ability to penetrate  armour. A lighter, 7-inch gun developed in the 1870s replaced the heavier gun in Avon and Elk. It replaced both heavy guns in Lynx, Hornet, Flirt, and Rocket.

Ships

Service
These ships were primarily designed for service in Southeast Asian waters, including the rivers, and most of the ships spent at least one commission there. Hornet, Midge, and Gnat spent their whole careers there. Gnats service, however, was rather short as she ran aground and was wrecked on Balabac Island, south of the Philippines, less than a year after she was commissioned. Their duties included protecting British lives and property and fighting pirates. Another major deployment area was the Gulf of Guinea in West Africa where Fly, Lynx, Flirt, Dwarf, Beacon, Avon, Pert, Growler, Rocket, Hart, and Boxer all spent part of one or more commissions. Beacon supported British coastal operations during the Third Anglo-Ashanti War in 1873 while most of the others engaged river pirates at various times. Rocket, Elk, Dwarf, Beacon, and Avon served at least one commission off the south-east coast of South America, while Cracker spent her entire career there. Teazer, Lynx, Beacon, and Thistle each made one deployment to the East Indies Station where they helped to suppress the slave trade between East Africa and the Persian Gulf. Beacon, Hart, and Growler were deployed to the Mediterranean where the former participated in the Bombardment of Alexandria in 1882. Fly, Flirt, Boxer, and Pert each spent a commission on fishery patrol on the Grand Banks of Newfoundland. Boxer was also deployed to British Columbia to maintain order with the Indian tribes there.

By the early 1880s, their engines were becoming worn out and most of the ships were placed into reserve for a few years before being sold for breaking up. The machinery of Avon, Dwarf and Elk was in good enough shape that they were assigned as tenders to the coastguard district ships at Hull, Southampton, and Liverpool for a number of years. Midge was also an exception and was retained in Chinese waters until 1907 when she was sold at Hong Kong. Elk lasted nearly as long in harbour service as she was reclassified as a tugboat in 1890 and was then sold as a dredger in 1905.

Notes

Footnotes

Bibliography

 

 
Gunboat classes